2020 Kazakhstan Super Cup was a Kazakhstan football match that was played on 29 February 2020 between the champions of 2019 Kazakhstan Premier League, Astana, and the winner of the 2019 Kazakhstan Cup, Kaisar.

Match details

See also
2019 Kazakhstan Premier League
2019 Kazakhstan Cup

References

2020
FC Astana matches
FC Kaisar matches
Supercup